William Joseph "B.J." Blazkowicz is a fictional character and the protagonist of the Wolfenstein series of alternate history video games starting with 1992's Wolfenstein 3D. An American spy of Polish and Jewish descent, he specializes in one-man missions behind enemy lines. In addition to fighting the regular German army he also frequently encounters bizarre Nazi experiments concerning biomechanical technology and the occult.

Biography 
Blazkowicz was born in August 1911 in the United States to Polish-American father Rip Blazkowicz and Jewish American mother Zofia Blazkowicz, and grew up near Mesquite, Texas. During World War II, B.J. became a sergeant in the U.S. Army Rangers, before receiving his commanding officer's commission and being recruited as the top agent for the United States Office of Secret Actions (OSA), a fictional version of the Office of Strategic Services, who dispatched him to investigate rumors of occult activity by the Third Reich's SS Paranormal Division (inspired by the real-world Ahnenerbe institute and the Thule Society).

The original timeline states that after World War II, in 1951 he married Julia Marie Peterson and reared a son named Arthur, who married a lady named Susan Elizabeth McMichaels and then came to have their own son who is the namesake of his grandfather. He would eventually star under a pseudonym, Billy Blaze, throughout the entire Commander Keen series. Billy Blaze later became the father of Doomguy, protagonist of the Doom series.

In the MachineGames timeline, he married Anya Oliwa; and fathered twin daughters, Jessie and Zofia, who continued to battle Nazis in the 1980s.

In video games

B.J. Blazkowicz entered the Wolfenstein series with Wolfenstein 3D in 1992. The motion comic series created to promote 2009's Wolfenstein claims a continuous (partially retconned) timeline with Wolfenstein 3D, Spear of Destiny, Return to Castle Wolfenstein, and finally Wolfenstein (later continued in Wolfenstein: The New Order, Wolfenstein: The Old Blood and Wolfenstein II: The New Colossus).

The missions that Blazkowicz participates in include assassinating a series of fictional leaders of German bio-chemical warfare research programs and eventually killing Adolf Hitler himself in Wolfenstein 3D, defeating the Nazi plot to use the Spear of Destiny to summon the Angel of Death in Spear of Destiny, and foiling Heinrich Himmler's ritual to resurrect Heinrich I (a historical king from medieval German history, here portrayed as an evil necromancer) in Return to Castle Wolfenstein, wherein he also finds out about Wilhelm "Deathshead" Strasse's plan to create an army of undead cyborgs.

In 2009's Wolfenstein, he returns to fight the resurgent Fourth Reich's use of a highly destructive energy of great power from the parallel world known as the Black Sun dimension, which is again pitting him against Deathshead.

The New Order establishes a new timeline that alters the previously perceived post-war profile, where Captain Blazkowicz suffers a head injury in 1946 that leaves him in a vegetative state for 14 years in a Polish asylum. In 1960, Blazkowicz awakens from his vegetative state as he is about to be executed, and joins the resistance against the Nazis who have conquered the whole world and who include his old nemesis Wilhelm "Deathshead" Strasse.

This storyline is continued in The New Colossus which directly follows up on the last events of The New Order where Blazkowicz nearly dies of grenade fragmentation injuries in the final battle but promptly gets evacuated by Anya Oliwa and the surviving Kreisau resistance members under the helm of Caroline Becker. Blazkowicz spends the next five months in a coma as a result of his grave wounds.

In the intro of The New Colossus, the player experiences memories of Blazkowicz's struggles during his youth with his abusive father. When Blazkowicz wakes up from his coma, he finds himself in an Kreisau occupied Nazi undersea vessel that is being attacked by the Nazis as Frau Engel has been hunting him down and effectively has taken over the commanding role after General Deathshead was assassinated by Blazkowicz.

Following the long history of Nazi killings, B.J. Blazkowicz was nicknamed "Terror Billy" by Nazi Order which becomes more apparent as the story progresses. In the past five months, The United States of America has surrendered to the Nazi Order and it's up to the Kreisau Circle to gather the thinly stretched underground Nazi resistance groups all over the United States. Also in The New Colossus, a German Jewish scientist, Set Roth, rescues B.J.'s head after he was beheaded by Frau Engel at the Lincoln Memorial, Washington D.C. on live-television, then attaches it with a Nazi-made Super Soldier's body which allows him to fight again.

In the spinoff Youngblood, an aged Blazkowicz goes missing and it's up to his daughters to track him down and rescue him.

Wolfenstein RPG is set in an alternate timeline, which is mostly light-hearted and humorous, and serves as prequel to the Doom series. At the end, B.J. defeats and maims the Harbinger of Doom, a Nazi-summoned demon that is none other than the later Cyberdemon from Doom. Blazkowicz's descendant is Sergeant Stan Blazkowicz, the protagonist of Doom RPG and one of the protagonists of Doom II RPG. B.J. Blazkowicz himself was also supposed to star in an early sequel Rise of the Triad: Wolfenstein 3D Part II, which was eventually released as just Rise of the Triad with no Wolfenstein plot connection at all.

Other appearances
In the 2005 German film Der Goldene Nazivampir von Absam 2 – Das Geheimnis von Schloß Kottlitz, William B.J. Blazkowicz, portrayed by Daniel Krauss, tracks down Nazi scientists in secret laboratories located in the Austrian Alps in order to disclose the secret of "miracle weapons" involving Dracula's bones and to find that events occurring in the Kottlitz Castle are beyond imagination. In 2007, Samuel Hadida bought the rights to make a more direct adaptation of the game series and Roger Avary was given task to write and direct the project that was said to be the story of B.J. Blazkowicz's mission to Hitler's Wolf's Lair.

In May 2012, to celebrate the 20th anniversary of Wolfenstein 3-D, Bethesda Softworks released a free B.J. Xbox Live Avatar mask over on the series' Facebook page. Classic B.J. Blazkowicz Mask was made a purchasable item for Doom at Xbox Live Marketplace.

In June 2017, Blazkowicz was added to Quake Champions as a playable champion. His in-game abilities include dual gun wielding and limited auto-healing.

In the 2019 movie Doom: Annihilation, a group of Marines travel to a base on a moon of Mars. The first body they find is identified as "William Blazkowicz", a Marine stationed on the base. In a nod to the Wolfenstein game, his body was decapitated, alluding to the events of Wolfenstein II: The New Colossus, when his decapitated head was placed on a German synthetic body to resurrect him. The Marine that finds him also comments on having to tell Blazkowicz's family about his death, a vague reference to his descendants.

Reception 
The character has been well received. In 2008, IGN included B.J. Blazkowicz on the list of characters they would like to see in an ultimate fighting game, calling him "the soldier who fired the first shot in the first-person-shooter wars", as well as in an ultimate "zombie strike team" of the best zombie fighters in entertainment. IGN also listed him as first on a list of top commandos in video games, as "really, there's no greater victory for a commando than killing Hitler. Kudos, Blazkowicz." In 2012, GamesRadar ranked him as 93rd "most memorable, influential, and badass" protagonist in video games." In an updated list published in 2018, GamesRadar ranked him the 9th best heroic character in video games.

UGO.com featured Blazkowicz on the list of the greatest Jews in gaming: "Being the Nazi-hating son of Polish immigrants does make B.J. a candidate, but his Judaism remains woefully unconfirmed. For all the Nazis he's chain-gunned through, B.J. deserves a framed honorary Jew certificate." The website Jew or Not Jew opined "he's probably just a Nazi-killing Pole." Kotaku's Stephen Totilo wrote that "the hints are" in The New Order that Blazkowicz is Jewish, such as his knowledge of written Hebrew. When Totilo contacted Bethesda Softworks, they told him it is "never explicitly stated" and the developer MachineGames decided to "leave it up to the player to interpret." The character's designer, Tom Hall, later confirmed that Blazkowicz's mother was Jewish.

According to Spike's Jason Cipriano, "The New Order seems to be the first game that really gives the character some depth, and instead of just being another American, hell-bent on ending the Nazi regime Blazkowicz seems like he's a more multilayered character. B.J. has friends, a love interest, and a deeper reason to take down the Nazis: this time around he's not just trying to win a war - he's trying to save the world." Anthony John Agnello of The A.V. Club noted MachineGames strived "to render Blazkowicz as a whole human being—at least, as human as he can be when he’s killing literally thousands of people, robots, dogs, and robot dogs." GamesRadar's Ryan Taljonick opined B.J. [has become] a pretty interesting character, and delivers several internal monologues with just the right amount of drama" while Brian Bloom's  "fantastic voicework makes them believable." In his review of The New Order, Lee Cooper of Hardcore Gamer wrote that "where it succeeds beyond the basest point is in its execution of characters, particularly Blazkowicz himself, who offers no more depth than porta potty but somehow manages to shine as leading man" and "the grittiest, manliest, most absolute Nazi-killin’ machine."

See also
Doomguy
Duke Nukem (character)
Gordon Freeman

References

Further reading

Fictional American people in video games
Fictional Polish Jews
Fictional Polish-American people
Fictional characters from Texas
Fictional military captains
Fictional patricides
Fictional gunfighters in video games
Fictional American Jews in video games
Fictional revolutionaries
Fictional sergeants
Fictional United States Army Rangers personnel
Fictional World War II veterans
Fictional Nazi hunters
Fictional people sentenced to death
Fictional characters with post-traumatic stress disorder
First-person shooter characters
Male characters in video games
Microsoft protagonists
Science fiction video game characters
Fictional secret agents and spies in video games
Fictional mass murderers
Fictional soldiers in video games
Fictional terrorists
Fictional torturers and interrogators
Wolfenstein
Video game characters introduced in 1992
Bethesda characters